(born December 20, 1935 in Amagasaki, Hyogo, Japan) is a businessman and Thoroughbred horse racing enthusiast.

The owner of a number of racehorses, the most notable of which was  2000 Kentucky Derby winner Fusaichi Pegasus whom he sold for a reported US$64 million to Ireland's Coolmore Stud. Other successful horses Sekiguchi owned include Tokyo Yushun winner Fusaichi Concorde and Fusaichi Pandora, winner of the 2006 Q.E. II Cup.

References
 Fusao Sekiguchi's profile at the NTRA
 Fusao Sekiguchi's official website as it appeared on May 10, 2009

1935 births
Japanese businesspeople
Japanese racehorse owners and breeders
Owners of Kentucky Derby winners
People from Amagasaki
Living people